The following is a list of the television networks and announcers who broadcast college football's Aloha Bowl throughout the years.

References

Aloha
Broadcasters
Aloha Bowl
Aloha Bowl